Snapper is an EP by New Zealand indie rock group Snapper, released in 1988 through Flying Nun Records.

Critical reception
In its review of the 2013 Record Store Day re-release, Pitchfork wrote that "each track hums to the sound of a familiar organ drone and a wash of distorted guitar, all tied into a precision-tooled drive that mirrors Klaus Dinger's motorik drumming in Neu!"

Track listing

"Buddy" – 3:40   
"Cause of You" – 3:43   
"Death and Weirdness in the Surfing Zone" – 2:44   
"Hang On" – 5:26

Personnel
Snapper
Alan Haig – drums
Dominic Stones – guitar, vocals
Christine Voice – keyboards, vocals, guitar
Peter Gutteridge – vocals, guitar, keyboards

Charts

References

Snapper (band) albums
1988 EPs
Flying Nun Records EPs
Dunedin Sound albums